Patrick Kennedy (born 12 February 1985) is a British theatre director and producer recognized as one of the major figures of the twenty-first century European avant-garde. He is the founder of The Phenomenological Theatre based in London and Sydney. He is a leading expert on the work of Richard Foreman. Most notable for creating and directing new musical Halbwelt Kultur and directing several UK premieres of Richard Foreman and Stanley Silverman's work, Kennedy's career has focused on avant garde plays and musicals.

Early life
Kennedy was born in Huddersfield, West Yorkshire, England.  He was educated at the University of Birmingham graduating with a degree in French, Italian and Chinese.  He completed a postgraduate research degree at the university specializing in American actor training techniques of the twentieth century.

Career

Kennedy has been the Artistic Director of The Phenomenological Theatre (originally PK Productions) since 2008, during which his 2009 production of The Lesson won critical acclaim from The Scotsman.

In 2012 he devised and directed Halbwelt Kultur at the Churchill Theatre.  The show was the VIP pre-show to Rufus Norris's Cabaret during its run at the theatre before moving on to Notting Hill, Battersea, Riverside Studios and Jermyn Street Theatre.

In 2013, Kennedy directed the second and largest incarnation of If It Only Even Runs A Minute at the London Hippodrome. 
In 2014, Kennedy directed the London premiere of Up From Paradise by Arthur Miller and European premiere of Doctor Selavy's Magic Theatre by Richard Foreman. In April 2014, Kennedy devised and directed a celebratory concert at the London Hippodrome of American composer Stanley Silverman. In November 2014 he adapted and directed the world premiere of The Cherry Orchard set in London in 1976.

In January 2016, Kennedy directed the four hour tribute concert to David Bowie following the singer's death. Titled Starman: A Celebration Of David Bowie, the concert took place at the Union Chapel in Islington and featured established acts such as Dan Gillespie-Sells and The Magic Numbers.

In October 2016, Kennedy once again worked with Stanley Silverman to bring another Silverman/Foreman premiere to the UK. Hotel For Criminals played at New Wimbledon Studio from October 18–29 and garnered critical acclaim for its bold, unique and surreal visuals.

Continuing to bring the work of Richard Foreman to the UK, Kennedy directed, designed, choreographed and produced the UK premiere of King Cowboy Rufus Rules The Universe at the London Theatre Workshop. Critics called the production "An ambitious, brave play. Genuinely unsettling, disorientating and confrontational"  and declared Kennedy as "one of the country's most fascinating theatre practitioners".

On 7 Dec 2018, Kennedy announced a year long partnership with New Wimbledon Theatre entitled Foreman At Fifty, a season of three plays from three unique parts of Richard Foreman's career to celebrate his 50th anniversary as a theatre maker.

The Phenomenological Theatre

Kennedy launched The Phenomenological Theatre on 14 January 2018. The Phenomenological Theatre creates impulsive, chimerical stage productions summoned from deep inside the unconscious which turbulently reverberate. It produces multi-layered, deeply complex theatre pieces which speak to the transcendental phenomenology of humanity. Under Patrick Kennedy's deeply idiosyncratic aesthetic direction, The Phenomenological Theatre incorporates vaudeville, philosophy, slapstick, dadaism, surrealism and limitless other divergent sources.

A statement from Patrick Kennedy said, "50 years after Richard Foreman founded his Ontological-Hysteric Theater, I thought it critical that we answer London's need for a new avant garde theatre company which continues Richard's work in the exploration of consciousness. This is especially important given the perilous social, economic and political times we live in."

Credits
 2019: Halbwelt Kultur
 2019: Zomboid!
 2019: Lava
 2019: Pain(t)
 2018: Elephant Steps
 2017: King Cowboy Rufus Rules The Universe!
 2016: Hotel For Criminals
 2016: Fantastic Medicine (Workshop)
 2016: Starman: A Celebration Of David Bowie
 2014: The Cherry Orchard
 2014: Up From Paradise
 2014: Celebrating Silverman
 2014: Doctor Selavy's Magic Theatre
 2013: If It Only Even Runs A Minute
 2013: Halbwelt Kultur
 2012: Halbwelt Kultur
 2012: The Cherry Orchard
 2011: Marat/Sade
 2010: The Laramie Project
 2010: Antony and Cleopatra
 2009: Who's Afraid of Virginia Woolf?
 2009: The Lesson
 2008: What The Butler Saw
 2008: Therese Raquin

Awards
 2019 – Offies Award nomination for IDEA Production, ZOMBOID!

References

1985 births
Living people
English theatre directors
Alumni of the University of Birmingham